Amzad Hossain Sarker was a Bangladesh Nationalist Party politician and the former Member of Parliament of Nilphamari-4. He was mayor of Saidpur Paurashava.

Career
Sarker was elected to parliament from Nilphamari-4 as a Bangladesh Nationalist Party candidate in 2001.

Death
Sarker died on 14 January 2021 from COVID-19 during the COVID-19 pandemic in Bangladesh.

References

Bangladesh Nationalist Party politicians
2021 deaths
9th Jatiya Sangsad members
1958 births
Deaths from the COVID-19 pandemic in Bangladesh